Devananda Bharali (1883-1972) was a pioneer linguist,  writer, translator and dramatist from Assam. He also wrote many articles using the pen name of Miri. He was born in June, 1883 in Sivasagar district, Assam to Ishananda Bharali.

Literary career
Bharali's writings are both in English and Assamese language. Some of his major works include:
 Asamiya bhashar moulik bicar aru sahityor chinaki (অসমীয়া ভাষাৰ মৌলিক বিচাৰ আৰু সাহিত্যৰ চিনাকি), published in 1912., 
 Assamese Grammar in English (1902),
 A Study of the Phonology and Vocabulary of Assamese Language (1960). 
 Cīnā Luitaea pāre, pāre (1972) 
He was a regular writer in the Assamese magazines like "Usha", "Banhi". He had translated the "Macbeth" of Shakespeare into Assamese language for the first time.

Bharali's dramatical works include: 
 Bhimdarpa (ভীমদৰ্প), an abridged translation of Macbeth published in 1910 
 Srimonto Sankar (শ্ৰীমন্ত শংকৰ) (1944)
 Bihu (বিহু)

See also
 Assamese literature
 History of Assamese literature
 List of Asam Sahitya Sabha presidents
 List of Sahitya Akademi Award winners for Assamese
 List of Assamese-language poets
 List of Assamese writers with their pen names

References

External links
 Read online edition of AXAMIYĀ BHĀXĀR MOULIK BISĀR at archive.org.
  Journal of the Royal Asiatic Society of Great Britain and Ireland by Royal Asiatic Society of Great Britain and Ireland.

Dramatists and playwrights from Assam
1883 births
1972 deaths
People from Sivasagar district
Scholars from Assam
20th-century Indian linguists
Indian male dramatists and playwrights
20th-century Indian dramatists and playwrights
20th-century Indian translators
19th-century Indian translators
20th-century Indian male writers